The 2019 Men's EuroHockey Junior Championship III was the tenth edition of the Men's EuroHockey Junior Championship III, the third level of the men's European under-21 field hockey championships organized by the European Hockey Federation. It was held from 18 to 21 July 2019 in Vilnius, Lithuania.

Wales won their first EuroHockey Junior Championship III title and were promoted to the 2022 Men's EuroHockey Junior Championship II.

Results

Preliminary round

Final

Statistics

Final standings

See also
2019 Men's EuroHockey Championship III
2019 Men's EuroHockey Junior Championship II

References

Men's EuroHockey Junior Championship III
Junior 3
International field hockey competitions hosted by Lithuania
Sports competitions in Vilnius
21st century in Vilnius
EuroHockey Junior Championship III
EuroHockey Junior Championship III
EuroHockey Junior Championship III